Jim or Jimmy Scott may refer to:

Music
 Jimmy Scott (1925–2014), American jazz vocalist
 Jim Scott (producer), music engineer and producer
 Jim Scott (musician), acoustic guitar player and songwriter
 Jimmy Scott (songwriter), British-born musician and songwriter, known for his work on Roger Daltrey's Can't Wait to See the Movie

Politics
 Jim Scott (trade unionist) (1900–1962), Scottish trade union leader
 Jim Scott (Virginia politician) (1938–2017), American politician and community affairs consultant
 Jim Scott (Australian politician) (born 1946), politician from Western Australia

Sports
 James Melvin Scott (1911–2001), American author, inventor, and Senior Olympian
 Jim Scott (American football) (fl. 1986–2004), American college football coach
 Jim Scott (bowls) (born 1950), New Zealand lawn and indoor bowls player
 Jim Scott (footballer) (born 1940), Scottish international association football player
 Jim Scott (pitcher) (1888–1957), American professional baseball pitcher
 Jim Scott (shortstop) (born John William Scott; 1887–1962), American professional baseball shortstop
 Jimmy Scott (born Martin Scott in 1986), Scottish association football player
 Jimmy Scott (footballer, born 1927), Scottish footballer
 Jimmy Scott (footballer, born 1934), English association football player
 Jimmy Scott (curler) (fl. 1959), Scottish curler

See also 
James Scott (disambiguation)
Jamie Scott (disambiguation)